Jani Sarajärvi (born 9 September 1979 in Pudasjärvi) is a Finnish-born professional football manager who is currently working as a coach-analyst for The Gambia national team. Sarajärvi, a former pro player, has previously held head or assistant coaching positions in three continents, both in premier club level and national team settings. As a researcher PhD student at the University of Lisbon, one of the best academic football institutions in Europe, he is also a highly motivated student of the game.

Club career 
Sarajärvi’s professional playing career lasted 11 years and during this time he played in Veikkausliiga and Allsvenskan, earning one senior cap for Finnish national football team and eight for under-21 national team. He won silver and bronze in Veikkausliiga, silver in Finnish cup, and three Finnish League cups.

Upon retiring in 2010, Sarajärvi began his coaching career as a player-assistant coach at FC YPA in Finnish third tier 2011, later returning to the club as a head coach for years 2013-14. After that, Sarajärvi has worked for VPS and HJK in Finland, Independiente del Valle in Ecuador, and The Gambia national team.

Coaching career

The Gambia national team 
After an invitation from head coach Tom Saintfiet, in November 2021 Sarajärvi agreed for a coach-analyst role in The Gambia national team. Sarajärvi started to work with the team during preparation for AFCON 2021 tournament, where the team had qualified for the first time ever in the country’s history. In the AFCON group phase, The Gambia surprised everyone by wins over Tunisia and Mauritania and a draw against Mali. The surprises continued in the round of 16 with a 1-0 win over Guinea, but the tournament came to an end in a quarter-final match against Cameroon (0-2). After AFCON 2021, Sarajärvi continues as a coach-analyst for The Gambia national team. The team is currently in the qualification stage for the AFCON 2023 in group G with Mali, Congo and South Sudan.

Independiente del Valle 
For the year 2020, Sarajärvi was contracted by Independiente del Valle, for an assistant coach role in the club’s 2nd team full of Ecuadorian youth national team players. Led by the head coach Yuri Solano, the goal was to develop the young players into 1st team and help them towards international careers. The team went on to win Copa Libertadores U20 as a first ever Ecuadorian team, beating clubs such as CR Flamengo in the semi-final and River Plate in the final. Three of the players from that team, namely Moisés Caicedo, Piero Hincapié, and William Pacho, later played in the senior national team of Ecuador at World Cup of Qatar 2022. The team also competed in the Ecuadorian Serie B, but the season was ended because of Covid-19 outbreak. After spending a few months in heavy isolation, Sarajärvi returned to Lisbon, Portugal, for his PhD studies.

HJK 
Late 2018, Mika Lehkosuo, one of the most renowned football coaches ever in Finland, persuaded Sarajärvi to Finland and assist him in Finnish giant club HJK for the season 2019. As the most successful club in Finland, the goal was to win a double and to qualify either to UEFA Champions or Europa League. Lehkosuo and Sarajärvi set to develop the team and playing style to reach the targets. Pre-season started well with a good performance against the Scottish giant Glasgow Rangers (loss 2-3) and a 3-1 win against top Swedish club Hammarby IF. The regular season started also well with two wins but underperformance in the next eight games (6 draws and two losses) lead to sacking of the head coach Mika Lehkosuo. Sarajärvi’s contract would have run until the end of season, but he decided to step out as a mark of loyalty for his head coach.

VPS 
Years 2016-17, Sarajärvi worked as an assistant coach for VPS in Veikkausliiga. In their 1st season, in a staff led by Head Coach Petri Vuorinen, Sarajärvi helped the team to establish a new more active playing style and gain 61% more points compared to season 2015, when the club almost relegated. The team went through total rejuvenation and won a UEFA Europa League qualification place, finishing 4th in the league, with 2nd least goals allowed.

Also season 2017 got a successful start, as VPS held on the 2nd place still in the middle of the season. The team also went on to surprise the favorites of NK Olimpija Ljubljana in the UEFA Europa League qualification, winning 1-0 both home and away. In the 2nd qualification round, VPS met the Danish giant Bröndby IF, VPS lost away 0-2 but held on to surprise at home, finally winning only 2-1, and was knocked out of the competition.

In the middle of the season 2017, Sarajärvi announced that he would pursue a PhD degree in football coaching at University of Lisbon and was leaving the club after the season.

FC YPA 
After a pro playing career, Sarajärvi started his professional coaching career in FC YPA at Finnish third tier, working as a head coach in 2013-14 (after first playing and assistant coaching in the same team season 2011).

Sarajärvi is FC YPA’s most successful coach ever. The team gained +90% and +107% more points during respective two years in reign compared to the season before his employment. These records have still not been broken. Sarajärvi also coached the club’s futsal team Sievi Futsal in Finnish futsal league, leading the team to its first ever league medal (bronze). Sarajärvi has later commented on the benefits of futsal for football coaching.

Education 
Sarajärvi has completed High-Performance Football Coaching course at University of Lisbon with teachers such as José Mourinho and Pedro Caixinha. He holds UEFA A coaching license from the FA of Finland.

Sarajärvi is also a researcher PhD student at University of Lisbon, a school that has educated coaches as Mourinho, Caixinha, and Rúben Amorim. His main research areas are high-performance coaching, game analysis, and football skill.

References

External links
 

1979 births
People from Pudasjärvi
Finnish footballers
Finnish expatriate footballers
Finnish expatriate sportspeople in Sweden
Finland international footballers
Veikkausliiga players
Allsvenskan players
IFK Norrköping players
Expatriate footballers in Sweden
Living people
FC YPA players
Association football defenders
Sportspeople from North Ostrobothnia